Sungai Petani Municipal Council is the local government which administers Sungai Petani and the whole Kuala Muda District, Kedah, Malaysia. It is the most populous local government in Kedah.

Origins of the establishment

The early history of the establishment of the Local Government system in Sungai Petani began in the 1950s, when the Local Councils Ordinance, 1952 was approved and adopted. Then, in 1953, the Lembaga Bandaran Sungai Petani (Sungai Petani Town Board) for the administration of the town area was established.

On August 1, 1975, the Kuala Muda Local Government District Council (Majlis Daerah Kerajaan Tempatan Kuala Muda, MDKTKM) was established to cover the Sungai Lalang, Jeniang, Merbok, Bukit Selambau, Bedong and Gurun.
On February 1, 1978, the Kuala Muda District Council (Majlis Daerah Kuala Muda, MDKM) was created to replace MDKTKM, the force of Law 124 of the Local Government (Temporary Provisions) Act which was gazetted in accordance with Section 3 of the Local Government Act 1976 (Act 171).

This involves the establishment of Local Authorities of the merged Town Board as follows:

Sungai Petani Town Council.
Kuala Muda Town Board, Kota Kuala Muda Town Board, Padang Lembu Town Board, Semeling Town Board, Tanjung Dawai Town Board, and Tanjung Batu Town Board.
Sungai Lalang Local Council, Jeniang Local Council, Merbok Local Council, Bukit Selambau Local Council, Bedong Local Council and Gurun Local Council.

The Kuala Muda District Council (MDKM) is responsible for administering the whole area of Kuala Muda district in planning, building control, health, development and licensing projects. MDKM once again upgraded to Sungai Petani Municipal Council (Majlis Perbandaran Sungai Petani Kedah, MPSPK) on July 2, 1994 equal to 22 Muharram 1415H and this declaration was executed by the Honourable Tan Sri Dato 'Seri Haji Osman bin Haji Aroff, PSM, SSDK, DHMS, JMN, JP - Chief Minister of Kedah Darul Aman at the time.

With this upgrade, MPSPK responsible for the entire development control, licensing, planning, and provision of facilities for the advancement of urban development and prosperity of the urban population living in Sungai Petani and Kuala Muda in general.

Administration Area

MPSPK's municipal area covers the entire Kuala Muda District. Major cities and towns in the area include Bedong, Gurun, Tikam Batu and Jeniang also have municipal office branches.

See also
 List of local governments in Malaysia

References

Local government in Kedah
1953 establishments in Malaya